Agyneta kopetdaghensis is a species of sheet weaver found in Iran and Turkmenistan. It was described by Tanasevitch in 1989.

References

kopetdaghensis
Spiders described in 1989
Spiders of Asia